Salinimonas is a bacteria genus from the family of Alteromonadaceae.

References

Alteromonadales
Bacteria genera